Sambang station is a railway station in Sambang-ri, Sep'o county, Kangwŏn province, North Korea, on the Kangwŏn Line of the Korean State Railway.

Originally called Sambanghyŏp station (Chosŏn'gŭl: 삼방협역; Hanja: 三防峡駅), the station, along with the rest of the former Kyŏngwŏn Line, was opened by the Japanese on 16 August 1914.

References

Railway stations in North Korea